Eternal Rain is the debut Japanese studio album by South Korean pop and R&B singer Rain, released through King Records Japan on September 13, 2006. The album allowed for Rain to expand into the Japanese market after the success of It's Raining.

Overview 
The album was released in three editions: CD only, CD+DVD and CD+DVD with a T-shirt. Commercially, Eternal Rain peaked at number 14 on the Oricon Albums Chart in Japan in the week of September 25, 2006, and charted for a total of 5 weeks.

Track listing

References

Rain (entertainer) albums
King Records (Japan) albums
2006 albums
Japanese-language albums